Shahla Riahi (7 February 1927 – 31 December 2019) was an Iranian actress and film director.

Born in Tehran, she started stage acting in 1944 and first appeared in cinema in Golden Dreams. In 1956 she became the first Iranian woman to direct a feature, with Marjan. Her career as a film actress includes more than 72 features.

Riahi died on 31 December 2019 at the age of 92.

References

External links
 

1927 births
2019 deaths
People from Tehran
Iranian film actresses
Iranian stage actresses
Iranian television actresses
Iranian women film directors
20th-century Iranian actresses